Cockings is a surname. Notable people with the surname include:

George Cockings (died 1802), English writer
Percy Cockings (1885–1963), British wrestler